The lesbian, gay, bisexual and transgender (LGBT) community in San Francisco is one of the largest and most prominent LGBT communities in the United States. In the 1970s, the city's gay male population rose from 30,000 at the beginning of the decade to 100,000 in a city of 660,000 at the end of it. In 1993 Stephen O. Murray, in "Components of Gay Community in San Francisco," wrote that most LGBT residents of San Francisco had originated from other cities and had "come out" in other cities.

A 2015 Gallup poll found that 6.2% of San Francisco-Oakland-Hayward inhabitants identified as LGBT, the highest of any metropolitan area in the United States. In the city of San Francisco itself, a 2006 survey found that 15.4% of its inhabitants identified as LGBT. In U.S. Congressional District 8, which consists of San Franciscans of voting age, 16.6% of adults identify as LGBT.

This list includes people born or raised in the San Francisco metropolitan area, as well as those who originated their careers there.

Activists
Lisa Ben
 Harry Britt
 Cecilia Chung
Angela Davis
Felicia Elizondo
 Cleve Jones
 Janetta Johnson
 Bill Kraus
 Del Martin and Phyllis Lyon
 Isa Noyola
Christina Olague
 Aria Sa'id
 Jose Sarria
 Mia Satya
 Adela Vazquez
Merle Woo

Art

Actors
 Aleshia Brevard
Aubrey O'Day
 Charlie Carver
 Dick Clair
 Lea DeLaria
 Rodney Kageyama
 Alec Mapa
 Vincent Rodriguez III
 Alicia Sixtos
 Ione Skye
 Zelda Williams
 BD Wong

Comedians
 Scott Capurro
 Margaret Cho
 Hannah Hart
 David Mills

Crafters
Kaffe Fassett

Dancers
 Sean Dorsey

Drag
 Peaches Christ
 Heklina
Honey Mahogany
 Charles Pierce
 Bebe Sweetbriar

Fashion
William Ware Theiss
Kaisik Wong

Filmmakers
Esther Eng
Savannah Knoop

Illustrators
Rex

Musicians
Jessica Bejarano
Linda Tillery
Michael Tilson Thomas
Remi Wolf

Painters
Tauba Auerbach
Bernice Bing
Lenore Chinn
Jess
Anna Elizabeth Klumpke
Martin Wong

Photographers
Lenn Keller
Mia Nakano

Poets
Robert Duncan

Singers
 Sylvester

Athletes

Figure skating
Brian Boitano
Rudy Galindo

Wrestlers
Gabbi Tuft

Businesspeople
 Sam Altman
Todd B. Hawley
Chuck Holmes
Bradford Shellhammer
 Theresa Sparks
 Rikki Streicher

Chefs
Elka Gilmore
Melissa King

Lawyers
Fay Stender

Politics
Roberta Achtenberg
 Tom Ammiano
 David Campos
Bevan Dufty
Rebecca Kaplan
Anne Kronenberg
Mark Leno
Rafael Mandelman
Carole Migden
 Harvey Milk
Jeff Sheehy
Scott Wiener

Pornography
Venus Lux
Al Parker
Dylan Ryan
Madison Young

Religion
 Megan Rohrer

Writers
 Jack Bee Garland
David Lourea
 Armistead Maupin
Toni Newman
 Carol Queen
 Randy Shilts
 Steve Silberman
 Michelle Tea
 Alice B. Toklas
 Lidia Yuknavitch

References

 
 
 
San Francisco
Lists of people from California
San Francisco-related lists
Lists of American LGBT people